Lipstick is the tenth studio album recorded by Mexican singer Alejandra Guzmán. It was released on March 23, 2004. It was produced by Desmond Child, William Edwards and Jules Gondar.

This album shows a darker image for the singer leading it to be panned by the critics, and was not as successful as other releases, however it managed to receive two Latin Grammy award nominations for Best Rock Song and Best Rock Solo Performance. It also received a Grammy Nomination for Best Latin Rock/Alternative album, the second American Grammy nomination for the singer and the first since 1992 when her album Flor de Papel was nominated.

The album yielded two singles: "Lipstick" and "Tu Eres Mi Luz".

Track listing
 "Lipstick" (Desmond Child, Lisa Greene, Alejandra Guzmán, Roger Russell, N.C. Thanh, Ernest Newsky, Storm Lee, Jodi Marr) — 03:13
 "Creo En Mí" (Steven Lewinson, Aldo Nova, Peter Lewinson, Cheín García-Alonso, Andreas Carlsson) — 03:14
 "Sálvame" (Desmond Child, Beto Cuevas) — 03:31	  
 "Hoy Me Voy a Querer" (Alejandra Guzmán, Ximena Muñoz, Desmond Child, Eric Bazilian, Bif Naked, Marlow Rosado) — 03:39	  
 "Tengo Derecho A Estar Mal" (Alejandra Guzmán, Ximena Muñoz, Betty Wright, Desmond Child, Marlow Rosado, Joss Stone) — 04:59
 "Mundos" (Juan Carlos Pérez Soto, Desmond Child, Jodi Marr) — 02:50
 "Un Juego Más" (Alejandra Guzmán, Ximena Muñoz, Desmond Child, Harry Sommerdahl, Marlow Rosado, Andreas Carlsson) — 03:43
 "Tú Corazón" (Alejandra Guzmán, Ximena Muñoz, Desmond Child, Marlow Rosado, Evan Lowenstein) — 03:31
 "Tu Eres Mi Luz" (Loris Ceroni, Ettore Grenci, Alejandra Guzmán, Ximena Muñoz, Marlow Rosado) — 03:09
 "Supersexitada" (Alejandra Guzmán, Desmond Child, Jodi Marr) — 03:05
 "Lipstick" (English Version) (Lisa Greene, Roger Russell, N.C. Thanh, Ernest Newsky, Storm Lee) — 03:14

Singles

References

2004 albums
Alejandra Guzmán albums
Albums produced by Desmond Child